She's Been Away is a 1989 British television play by Stephen Poliakoff and directed by Sir Peter Hall. In her final appearance it starred Dame Peggy Ashcroft, who won two awards at the Venice International Film Festival for her performance, as did Geraldine James.

Plot
The closure of a mental institution threatens to leave the elderly Lillian homeless. Her wealthy nephew Hugh takes her in, putting additional strain on his wife Harriet. Gradually, an awkward friendship develops between Harriet, on the verge of a nervous breakdown herself, and Lillian, who has spent fifty years as a mental patient.

References

External links
BBC site for programme

1989 television films
British television films
BBC television dramas